Ejnar Tønsager (12 April 1888 – 15 October 1967) was a Norwegian rowing coxswain who competed in the 1908 Summer Olympics and in the 1912 Summer Olympics.

In 1908 he was the coxswain of the Norwegian boat, which was eliminated in the first round of the coxed eight competition. Four years later he was again the coxswain of the Norwegian boat, which was eliminated in the semi-finals of the coxed four event. In some sources the crew members of this boat are also listed as bronze medalists.

References

External links
profile

1888 births
1967 deaths
Norwegian male rowers
Olympic rowers of Norway
Rowers at the 1908 Summer Olympics
Rowers at the 1912 Summer Olympics
Coxswains (rowing)